This is an alphabetical list of lists of known Hindi (mainly) songs performed, sung and/or recorded by Mohammed Rafi between 1942 and 1980. Over 5,000 of his songs are listed here. Mohammed Rafi also sang in several other languages, which might not be included here.

List of songs

See also 
 List of songs recorded by Mohammed Rafi
 Recorded songs (A)
 Recorded songs (B-C)
 Recorded songs (D-F)
 Recorded songs (G)
 Recorded songs (H-I)
 Recorded songs (K)
 Recorded songs (L)
 Recorded songs (M)
 Recorded songs (N)
 Recorded songs (O)
 Recorded songs (P-R)
 Recorded songs (S)
 Recorded songs (T)
 Recorded songs (U-Z)

J
Rafi, Mohammed